In gambling, a Dutch book or lock is a set of odds and bets, established by the bookmaker, that ensures that the bookmaker will profit—at the expense of the gamblers—regardless of the outcome of the event (a horse race, for example) on which the gamblers bet.  It is associated with probabilities implied by the odds not being coherent.

In economics, the term usually refers to a sequence of trades that would leave one party strictly worse off and another strictly better off.  Typical assumptions in consumer choice theory rule out the possibility that anyone can be Dutch-booked.

In philosophy it is used to explore degrees of certainty of beliefs. 

There is no agreement on the etymology of the term.

Gambling
The main point of the Dutch book argument is to show that rational people must have subjective probabilities for random events, and that these probabilities must satisfy the standard axioms of probability. Objectivists believe in frequency theory definitions of probability, which refer to objective outcomes of events like coin flips. This creates a problem in defining probabilities for random events like horse races—we cannot repeat the event under identical circumstances to learn the probabilities, which would correspond to the proportion of wins in the long run.

Subjectivists argue that probabilities can be defined via beliefs. Objectivists say that beliefs are too vague and qualitative to use for probabilities. The Dutch book argument (see also the related money pump argument) aims to show that beliefs about probabilities must be quantitative and satisfy standard probability axioms. This is done by first assuming that people with subjective probabilities would be willing to take fair bets on the basis of these probabilities. Then it is shown that if these subjective probabilities do not satisfy probability axioms, we can create a "Dutch book"—a collection of bets which would ensure sure losses for the holder of these "incoherent" beliefs, regardless of the outcome of the random events. The objection can be made that many people do not gamble. Subjectivists respond that the existence of bets which ensure loss is a sign of irrationality, regardless of whether people actually make the bets.

In one example, a bookmaker has offered the following odds and attracted one bet on each horse whose relative sizes make the result irrelevant. The implied probabilities, i.e. probability of each horse winning, add up to a number greater than 1.

Whichever horse wins in this example, the bookmaker will pay out $200 (including returning the winning stake)—but the punter has bet $210, hence making a loss of $10 on the race.

However, if horse 4 was withdrawn and the bookmaker does not adjust the other odds, the implied probabilities would add up to 0.95. In such a case, a gambler could always reap a profit of $10 by betting $100, $50 and $40 on the remaining three horses, respectively, and not having to stake $20 on the withdrawn horse, which now cannot win.

Another possibility is for a crooked gambler to fix a race by sabotaging the favourite. If the favourite horse starts the race at odds-on (less than 1–1 odds), then the remaining horses can be bet in proportion to their odds so as to guarantee a profit, no matter which horse wins.

Other forms of Dutch books can exist when incoherent odds are offered on exotic bets such as forecasting the order in which horses will finish. With competitive fixed-odds gambling being offered electronically, gamblers can sometimes create a Dutch book by selecting the best odds from different bookmakers, in effect undertaking an arbitrage operation. The bookmakers should react by adjusting the offered odds in the light of demand, so as to remove the potential profit.

In Bayesian probability, Frank P. Ramsey and Bruno de Finetti required personal degrees of belief to be coherent so that a Dutch book could not be made against them, whichever way bets were made. Necessary and sufficient conditions for this are that their degrees of belief satisfy the axioms of probability (with only finite additivity).

Economics

In economics, the classic example of a situation in which a consumer X can be Dutch-booked is if they have intransitive preferences. Suppose that for this consumer, A is preferred to B, B is preferred to C, and C is preferred to A. Then suppose that someone else in the population, Y, has one of these goods. Without loss of generality, suppose Y has good A. Then Y can first sell A to X for B+ε; then sell B to X for C+ε; then sell C to X for A+ε, where ε is some small amount of the numeraire. After this sequence of trades, X has given 3·ε to Y for nothing in return. This method is a money pump, where Y exploits X using an arbitrage-opportunity by taking advantage of X's intransitive preferences.

Economists usually argue that people with preferences like X's will have all their wealth taken from them in the market. If this is the case, we won't observe preferences with intransitivities or other features that allow people to be Dutch-booked. However, if people are somewhat sophisticated about their intransitivities and/or if competition by arbitrageurs drives epsilon to zero, non-"standard" preferences may still be observable.

See also
 Arbitrage betting
 Bayesian epistemology
 Cobra effect
 Coherence (philosophical gambling strategy)
 Dutching
 Mathematics of bookmaking

Footnotes

References

External links
Dutch Book Arguments in the Stanford Encyclopedia of Philosophy.
Probabilities as Betting Odds, report by C. Caves.
Notes on the Dutch Book Argument, by D. A. Freedman.

Applied probability
Consumer theory
Wagering